Bukitan is a Punan language of West Kalimantan, Indonesia.

External links

Languages of Indonesia
Languages of Malaysia
Endangered Austronesian languages
Punan languages